The Governor's Wife is an American reality television series that premiered on October 27, 2013, and aired on A&E. It chronicled the lives of former Louisiana governor, Edwin Edwards, his third wife Trina Edwards and their family. Trina Edwards was approached by producer about doing a reality show shortly after she and Edwin married on July 30, 2011. The former governor was not long out of federal prison, where he served 8 and a half years for bribery and extortion.

Cast
 Edwin Edwards, age: 86
 Trina Edwards, age: 35, Edwin's wife
 Anna Edwards, age: 63, Edwin's daughter and Trina's stepdaughter
 Victoria Edwards, age: 61, Edwin's daughter and Trina's stepdaughter
 Logan and Trevor, age: 16 and 14, Trina's sons and Edwin's stepsons

Episodes

Season 1 (2013)

References

External links

2010s American reality television series
2013 American television series debuts
2013 American television series endings
English-language television shows
A&E (TV network) original programming